Courtright is a surname. Notable people with the surname include:

Jennie Lee Courtright (1848–1925), American actress of the silent era
Jim Courtright (gunman) (1848–1887), American lawman, outlaw and gunfighter
Jim Courtright (athlete) (1914–2003), Canadian track and field athlete, Vice Principal of Queen's University
John Courtright (born 1970), American former Major League Baseball pitcher
Morris Courtright (1930–2010), American politician
Nick Courtright (born 1981), American poet
Ray Courtright (1891–1979), American football and baseball player and college coach of football, basketball, golf, and wrestling
William Courtright (1848–1933), American film actor
Milton Courtright Elliott (1879–1928), American lawyer and judge from Norfolk, Virginia

See also
Courtright, Ontario, township in southwestern Ontario, Canada
Courtright Reservoir, reservoir in Fresno County, California
Luke Short – Jim Courtright duel, duel in Fort Worth, Texas, United States, in 1887 between two well known gunmen
Cortright (disambiguation)
Cutright (disambiguation)